Dreaming Of A Bigger Life is the second solo album by the Polish-American electronic music artist Michal Menert released on June 8, 2010 by Pretty Lights Music. It is his first album after his departure from Pretty Lights. It is known for the tracks "Feeling Better", "Sun/Shadow", "Heart Attack" featuring Benjamin Linder O'Neill on vocals, and "The Ratio" co-produced by labelmate and friend since high school Paul Basic.

Track listing

References

2010 albums
Electronic albums by American artists
Hip hop albums by American artists